Cristian Arley Díaz Rincón (born 18 January 1993) is a Venezuelan footballer who plays as a forward. He is currently a free agent.

Career
Deportivo Táchira were Díaz's first senior club, having joined their youth system in 2007. After appearing in the professional tier two with their reserve team, the forward made his debut for the first-team side on 29 April 2012 during a Venezuelan Primera División draw against Yaracuyanos. He was selected twice more in the 2011–12 season. Díaz scored his first senior goal in the following September, netting the only goal in a 1–0 win over Estudiantes de Mérida at the Estadio Polideportivo de Pueblo Nuevo. Díaz departed Deportivo Táchira in January 2013, subsequently agreeing to join Lotería del Táchira of the Venezuelan Segunda División.

Career statistics
.

References

External links

1993 births
Living people
Place of birth missing (living people)
Venezuelan footballers
Association football forwards
Venezuelan Segunda División players
Venezuelan Primera División players
Deportivo Táchira F.C. players
20th-century Venezuelan people
21st-century Venezuelan people